The Giant of the Dolomites (Italian: Il gigante delle Dolomiti) is a 1927 Italian silent adventure film directed by Guido Brignone and starring Bartolomeo Pagano, Aldo Marus and Elena Lunda. It was the last in a series of silent films featuring the peplum hero Maciste, but the character was later revived in the 1960s.

Cast 
 Bartolomeo Pagano as Maciste, la guida alpina 
 Aldo Marus as Il nipotino Hans 
 Elena Lunda as Vanna Dardos 
 Dolly Grey as Maud, la pittrice 
 Andrea Habay as Ing. Ewert 
 Luigi Serventi as Müller, l'avventurieno 
 Oreste Grandi as Schulz il contrabbandiere 
 Felice Minotti
 Mario Saio
 Augusto Poggioli 
 Augusto Bandini

References

Bibliography 
 Brunetta, Gian Piero. The History of Italian Cinema: A Guide to Italian Film from Its Origins to the Twenty-first Century. Princeton University Press, 2009. 
 Ricci, Steven. Cinema and Fascism: Italian Film and Society, 1922–1943. University of California Press, 2008.

External links 
 

1927 films
Italian adventure films
Italian silent feature films
1920s Italian-language films
Films directed by Guido Brignone
Films set in the Alps
1927 adventure films
Mountaineering films
Maciste films
Italian black-and-white films
Silent adventure films
1920s Italian films